Traditional healers of Southern Africa are practitioners of traditional African medicine in Southern Africa. They fulfill different social and political roles in the community: divination; healing physical, emotional, and spiritual illnesses; directing birth or death rituals; finding lost cattle; protecting warriors; counteracting witchcraft; and narrating the history, cosmology, and concepts of their tradition. 

There are two main types of traditional healers within the Nguni, Sotho-Tswana, and Tsonga societies of Southern Africa: the diviner (isangoma) and the herbalist (inyanga). These healers are effectively South African shamans who are highly revered and respected in a society where illness is thought to be caused by witchcraft, pollution (contact with impure objects or occurrences) or through neglect of the ancestors. It is estimated that there are as many as 200,000 traditional healers in South Africa compared to 25,000 doctors trained in bio-medical medicine. Traditional healers are consulted by approximately 60% of the South African population, usually in conjunction with modern biomedical services. For harmony between the living and the dead, vital for a trouble-free life, traditional healers believe that the ancestors must be shown respect through ritual and animal sacrifice. They perform summoning rituals by burning plants like impepho (Helichrysum petiolare), dancing, chanting, channeling or playing drums. Traditional healers will often give their patients muthi—medications made from plant, animal and minerals—imbued with spiritual significance. These muthi often have powerful symbolism; for example, lion fat might be prepared for children to promote courage. There are medicines for everything from physical and mental illness, social disharmony and spiritual difficulties to potions for protection, love and luck.

Although sangoma is a Zulu term that is colloquially used to commonly describe all types of Southern African traditional healers, there are differences between practices: an inyanga is concerned mainly with medicines made from plants and animals, while a sangoma relies primarily on divination for healing purposes and might also be considered a type of fortune teller. In modern times, colonialism, urbanisation, apartheid and transculturation have blurred the distinction between the two and traditional healers tend to practice both arts. Traditional healers can alternate between these roles by diagnosing common illnesses, selling and dispensing remedies for medical complaints, and divining cause and providing solutions to spiritually or socially centred complaints.

Each culture has their own terminology for their traditional healers. Xhosa traditional healers are known as amaxhwele (herbalists) or amagqirha (diviners). Ngaka and selaoli are the terms in Northern Sotho and Southern Sotho respectively, while among the Venda they are called mungome. The Tsonga refer to their healers as n'anga or mungoma.

Beliefs and tradition

A sangoma is a practitioner of ngoma, a philosophy based on a belief in ancestral spirits (siSwati: amadloti; Zulu: amadlozi; Sesotho: badimo; Xhosa: izinyanya) and the practice of traditional African medicine, which is often a mix of medicinal plants and various animal body fats or skin.  Sangomas perform a holistic and symbolic form of healing by drawing on the embedded beliefs of the Bantu peoples in South Africa, who believe that ancestors in the afterlife guide and protect the living. Sangomas are called to heal, and through them it is believed that ancestors from the spirit world can give instruction and advice to heal illness, social disharmony and spiritual difficulties.  Traditional healers work in a sacred healing hut or indumba, where they believe their ancestors reside. Where no physical 'indumba' is available, a makeshift miniature sacred place called imsamo can be used.

Sangomas believe they are able to access advice and guidance from their ancestors for their patients through spirit possession by an ancestor, or mediumship, throwing bones, or by dream interpretation.  In possession states, the sangoma works themself into a trance through drumming, dancing and chanting, and allows their ego to step aside for an ancestor to take possession of his or her body and communicate directly with the patient, or dancing fervently beyond their stated ability. The sangoma will provide specific information about the problems of the patient. Some sangomas speak to their patients through normal conversation, whilst others speak in tongues, or languages foreign to their patients, but all languages used by sangomas are indigenous Southern African languages depending on the specific ancestors being called upon. Not all sangomas follow the same rituals or beliefs.

Ancestral spirits can be the personal ancestors of the sangoma or the patient or they might be general ancestors associated with the geographic area or the community.  It is believed that the spirits have the power to intervene in people's lives who work to connect the sangoma to the spirits that are acting in a manner to cause affliction. For example, a crab could be invoked as a mediator between the human world and the world of spirits because of its ability to move between the world of the land and the sea. Helping and harming spirits are believed to use the human body as a battleground for their own conflicts. By using ngoma, the sangoma believes they can create harmony between the spirits which is thought to bring an alleviation of the patient's suffering.

The sangoma may burn incense (like impepho) or sacrifice animals to please the ancestral spirits. Snuff is also used to communicate with the ancestors through prayer.

Divination, diagnosis and healing practices
A sangoma's goal in healing is to establish a balanced and harmless relationship between the afflicted patient and the spirits that are causing their illness or problem. The healer intercedes between the patient and the world of the dead in order to make restitution.  This is generally performed through divination (throwing the bones or ancestral channeling), purification rituals, or animal sacrifice to appease the spirits through atonement.

Throwing the bones to access the advice of ancestors is an alternative practice to the exhausting ritual of possession by the ancestor.  In a typical session, a patient will visit the sangoma and the sangoma must determine what the affliction is or the reason the patient has come to them for help. Before the throwing of the bones, the healer should first ask the name and surname of the patient; the healer then calls the ancestors by names, starting with his/her initiators' names, then his/hers, followed by the patient's ancestor's names. The patient or diviner throws bones on the floor, which may include animal vertebrae, dominoes, dice, coins, shells and stones, each with a specific significance to human life. For example, a hyena bone signifies a thief and will provide information about stolen objects. The sangoma or the patient throws the bones but the ancestors control how they lie. The sangoma then interprets this metaphor in relation to the patient's afflictions, what the ancestors of the patient require, and how to resolve the disharmony. In the same way, sangomas will interpret metaphors present in dreams, either their own or their patients. 

When the diviner comes to an acceptable understanding of the problem and the patient agrees, the diviner then needs to again throw the bones to ask the ancestors if he/she could help the patient. Depending on the feedback from the bones he/she will instruct the patient on a course of medicine which may include the use of ngoma, referral to a herbalist, inyanga (if the sangoma does not have the knowledge themselves), or recommend a Western medicine regimen.

Medicines and muthi

The spiritually curative medicines prescribed by a traditional healer are called muthi. They may be employed in healing as warranted in the opinion of the herbal specialist or inyanga. Muthi is a term derived from a Zulu word for tree.  African traditional medicine makes extensive use of botanical products but the medicine prescribed by an inyanga may also include other formulations which are zoological or mineral in composition. Traditional medicine uses approximately 3,000 out of 30,000 species of higher plants of Southern Africa. Over 300 species of plants have been identified as having psychoactive healing effects on the nervous system, many of which need further cultural and scientific study In South African English and Afrikaans, the word muthi is sometimes used as a slang term for medicine in general. 
 
Muthis are prepared, and depending on the affliction, a number of purification practices can be administered Ukuzila Fasting one of the most important thing to do in preparing muthi and healing.  These practices include bathing, vomiting, steaming, nasal ingestion, enemas, and cuttings:

 Bathing – Herbal mixtures are added to bath water to purify the patient
 Vomiting (phalaza) – A large volume (up to +-2 liters) of a weak, lukewarm herbal infusion is drunk and a process of self-induced vomiting occurs to cleanse and tone the system.
 Steaming (futha) – Medicinal herbs are commonly inhaled by steaming them in a bucket of boiling water.  A blanket is used to cover the patient and container.  Hot rocks or a portable stove may be included to keep the bucket boiling. The patient sits under the blanket or plastic (preferably) as blankets get to absorb the heat and the steam does not rotate well, breathes in the herbal steam and sweats.
 Nasally – A variety of plants can be taken dried and powdered as snuff.  Some are taken to induce sneezing which may traditionally be believed to aid the expulsion of disease.  Others are taken for the common conditions such as headaches.
 Enemas – Infusions and some decoctions are commonly administered as enemas.  The enema is a preferred route of administration of certain plant extracts, as it is believed they are more effective when administered this way.
 Cuttings (ukugcaba) – Extracts or powders are directly applied to small cuts made with a razor blade in the patient's skin.

An experienced inyanga/Sangoma will generally seek the guidance of an ancestral spirit before embarking to find and collect muthi and you can also go to herbalists to ask for a certain plant/herb you need. The healer, through dreams or during prayers, believes they are advised of auspicious times for collecting the plants. In some cases, symbols and dreams are also interpreted to determine which particular plants to collect for a specific patient and where these plants are located, not in all cases as most traditional healers have their herbs stored in their huts(eNdumbeni).  The healer supplements the perceived advice from an ancestral spirit with their own knowledge, training and experience.

Thwasa and initiation
Both men and women can become traditional healers. A sangoma is believed to be "called" to heal through an initiation illness; symptoms involve psychosis, headaches, intractable stomach pain, shoulder, neck complaints, short breath, swollen feet and waist issues or illness that cannot be cured by conventional methods. These problems together must be seen by a sangoma as thwasa or the calling of the ancestors. Sangomas believe that failure to respond to the calling will result in further illness until the person concedes and goes to be trained.  The word thwasa is derived from thwasa which means 'the light of the new moon' or from ku mu thwasisa meaning 'to be led to the light'.

A trainee sangoma (or ithwasane) trains formally under another sangoma for a period of anywhere between a number of months and many years. The training involves learning humility to the ancestors, purification through steaming, washing in the blood of sacrificed animals, and the use of muti, medicines with spiritual significance.  The ithwasa may not see their families during training and must abstain from sexual contact and often live under harsh and strict conditions. This is part of the cleansing process to prepare the healer for a life's work of dedication to healing and the intense experiences of training tend to earn a deeply entrenched place in the sangoma's memory.

During the training period the ithwasa will share their ailments in the form of song and dance, a process that is nurtured by the analysis of dreams, anxieties, and with prayer.  The story develops into a song which becomes a large part of the graduation-type ceremony that marks the end of the ukuthwasa training.  At times in the training, and for the graduation, a ritual sacrifice of an animal is performed (usually chickens and a goat or a cow).

At the end of ukuthwasa and during initiation, early hours of the morning a goat that will be slaughtered should be a female one, that's for Umguni, the second one will be slaughtered the following morning after the chickens, which are sacrificed at the river Abamdzawo. All these sacrifices are to call to the ancestors and appease them. The local community, friends and family are all invited to the initiation to witness and celebrate the completion of training. The ithwasane is also tested by the local elder sangomas to determine whether they have the skills and insight necessary to heal.  The climactic initiation test is to ensure the ithwasa has the ability to "see" things hidden from view.  This is signified and proved when other sangomas hide the ithwasa's sacred objects, including the gall bladder of the goat that was sacrificed and the thwasane must, in front of the community, call upon their ancestors, find the hidden objects, which includes the skin of the goat, Umgamase, the ancestors clothes and return them back to the sangomas that hid them, thus proving they have the ability to "see" beyond the physical world. The heading practice is also done at night after taking off all those traditional clothing you had worn all day, they hide them for that thwasane to look for them again. The graduation ceremony takes three days from Friday to Sunday, the early hours of the morning the thwasane needs to sweep the whole yard, wash his/her clothes and also to bath at the river; he/she should return home when they are dry.

Drumming and ancestral dancing

Sangoma can also literally mean 'person of the drum' or 'the drumming one' and drumming is an important part of summoning the ancestors.  During times of celebration (e.g. at an Initiation) the possessed sangoma is called to dance and celebrate their ancestors.  The sangoma will fall into trance (when in trance the Sangoma is not conscious of what is happening, so after that he/she will be told of the things he/she had said) where the ancestors will be channeled (which is signified in Zulu traditions by episodes of convulsive fits) followed by the singing of ancestral songs. These songs are echoed back to the ancestor via the audience in a process of call and response.  The possessed sangoma will then change into their traditional ancestral clothing and dance vigorously while others drum and sing in celebration.

History and background

The Zulu word with prefix is isangoma (pl. izangoma), alternatively it is also spelled as umngoma (pl. abangoma), sa ngoma means 'do ngoma and i sa ngoma means "those who do ngoma", so sangoma or isangoma refers specifically to the practitioner of the ngoma practice. 

The term sangoma is often used colloquially in South Africa for equivalent professions in other Bantu cultures in Southern Africa.  Forms of the ngoma ritual are practiced throughout southern and south-eastern Africa in countries such as South Africa, Eswatini, Zimbabwe, Mozambique, Lesotho, Kenya, and Batswana. In more northern areas the practices are generally more diverse and less organized than the southern practices. Among the Kongo, the practice is called loka or more negatively doga, a term meaning witchcraft.

Ngoma is believed to have come to southern Africa during the western Bantu migration that began around 2000 BCE and was further influenced by the eastern Bantu migration that occurred until 500 CE.  The practice has evolved along with the social problems of its users. In pre-colonial form ngoma songs dealt mainly with issues of hunting. Over time the system adapted to include the introduction of guns, and later the racial and class struggles of practitioners under colonial rule. In Zimbabwe, the civil war experience led to a revival of ngoma practice with a new emphasis on the spirits of the victims of war.  The service allowed the sangoma to help people cope with their own violent acts as well as those they had fallen victim to. An example of this is the Tsonga who believe that one of the main alien spirits that can bestow powers of clairvoyance and the ability to detect witchcraft is the Ndau Spirit. The Ndau spirit possesses the descendants of the Gaza soldiers who had slain the Ndau and taken their wives. Once the Ndau spirit has been converted from hostile to benevolent forces, the spirits bestow the powers of divination and healing on the n'angna.

In addition, ngoma has been adapted by many to include both Christian and Muslim beliefs.

Legal status
Sangomas are legally recognized in South Africa as "traditional health practitioners", under the Traditional Health Practitioners Act of 2007 (Act. 22 of 2007) as diviners alongside herbalists, traditional birth attendants, and traditional surgeons. The act calls for the establishment of a national council of traditional health practitioners to regulate and register a.o. sangomas in the country. However, it was only in December 2011 that the National Department of Health took action and opened nominations for seats on an interim council. In October 2012, Health Department spokesperson Joe Maila advised that the department aimed to have the council up and running by the end of 2012. The Interim Traditional Health Practitioners Council was eventually inaugurated on 12 February 2013. Several sections of the act, dealing with the establishment and governance of the national council and the registration of practitioners, came into effect on 1 May 2014.

Previously, the South African Parliament had passed the Traditional Health Practitioners Act of 2004 (Act. 35 of 2004). However, the act was ruled unconstitutional after Doctors for Life International challenged it at the Constitutional Court, citing the insufficient public participation at provincial level in the drafting of the act.

The South African Law Reform Commission received a submission from the Traditional Healers Organisation requesting the investigation of the constitutionality of the Witchcraft Suppression Act of 1957 and the Mpumalanga Witchcraft Suppression Bill of 2007, the drafting of which was suspended in 2008. On 23 March 2010 the Minister of Justice and Constitutional Development approved a South African Law Reform Commission project to review witchcraft legislation. In March 2012 the South African Law Reform Commission advised that Ms Jennifer Joni has been designated as researcher and Judge Dennis Davis has been designated as project leader for Project 135: Review of witchcraft legislation. Dr Theodore Petrus, who completed a doctoral thesis on witchcraft-related crime in 2009, was invited to become part of an advisory committee to assist in the review.

White sangomas

While there are recorded instances of white sangomas before 1994, since 1994 an increasing number of white people have openly trained as sangomas in South Africa. The question of authenticity is still an ongoing discussion. According to Nokuzola Mndende of the Icamagu Institute, a Xhosa sangoma and former lecturer in religious studies at the University of Cape Town: Philip Kubekeli, director of the Traditional Medical Practitioners, Herbalist and Spiritual Healers Association, and Phephsile Maseko, spokesperson of the Traditional Healers Organisation, see nothing wrong with white sangomas.  Kubekeli and Maseko maintain the position that traditional healing knows no color.

Several white sangomas, interviewed by The Big Issue in 2010, claimed that they have been welcomed by the black community in South Africa, aside from isolated experiences of hostility. On the other hand, there have also been reports that white sangomas have been less readily accepted by black sangomas.

A number of the South African traditions (e.g. Swazi and Tsonga/Shangaan) believe that a foreign or alien spirit can call one to become a traditional healer, which they call Abandzawo, especially if there is a significant extreme relationship between one of the healer's biological ancestors and the foreign spirit that occurred in the past. Dr Nhlavana Maseko, founder of the Traditional Healers Organization, explains:

Relationship with bio-medical medicine

The formal health sector has shown continued interest in the role of sangomas and the efficacy of their herbal remedies. Botanists and pharmaceutical scientists continue to study the ingredients of traditional medicines in use by sangomas.  Well known contributions to world medicine from South African herbal remedies include aloe, buchu and devil's claw. Public health specialists are now enlisting sangomas in the fight, not only against the spread of HIV/AIDS, but also diarrhoea and pneumonia, which are major causes of death in rural areas, especially in children. In the past decade, the role of traditional healers has become important in fighting the impact of HIV and treating people infected with the virus before they advance to a point where they require (or can obtain) anti-retroviral drugs. However, there are no traditional medicines in South Africa that have clinically been proven to be effective in the treatment of HIV/AIDS. A conclusion from a review by UNAIDS in September 2000, regarding collaboration with traditional healers in HIV/AIDS prevention and care, found that modern and traditional belief systems are not incompatible, but complementary. 

While for many they provide the healing needed, there are some causes for concern. Charlatans who have not undergone thwasa charge exorbitant prices for fraudulent service, and not all countries in southern Africa have effective regulatory bodies to prevent this practice. Some sangomas have been known to abuse the charismatic power they have over their patients by sexually assaulting them, sometimes dressed up as ritual. Repeated use of the same razor blade to make incisions for muti carries HIV transmission risks in regions where the disease is rife. Western-style doctors have seen a number of cases of patients with serious gastrointestinal problems through the use of muti, especially in enema form, and have coined the phrase "ritual enema induced colitis" to describe the phenomenon.

Fraudulent sangomas and scam artists

The notion of traditional medicine has been exploited for financial gain by what are often called plastic shamans. In the Cape, they often adopt Muslim sounding names in order to attract the local Cape Coloured population, who are in part Muslim.

They advertise through flyers, posters and adverts that are commonly plastered on the streets and lampposts of cities throughout South Africa, especially in densely populated urban areas. The advertisements claim the ability to bring back lost lovers, potions to enlarge penises and spells that will make people rich or provide them with luck. Many people have lost significant amounts of money from scams, tricks and false promises that these charlatans use in their cons. Many women have significantly damaged their reproductive organs and the ability to reproduce, due to back street abortions.

Legitimate sangomas are angered by these charlatans and are working to end the trade of bogus traditional healers and fake sangomas through regulation, legal action and awareness.  They believe the charlatans harm the reputation of the legitimate traditional healers and also damage the lives of many innocent people. As a general rule, sangomas tend not to advertise through flyers or posters.  They tend to rely more on their reputation, word of mouth and their trust in their ancestors to bring them the right clients.

Mary Bungeni, a sangoma herself, explains: 

Dr Motlalepula Matsabisa, director of the Medical Research Council's Indigenous Knowledge Unit, says there appears to be many fake traditional healers around, however because of a lack of regulation, they go unchecked and explains that if anyone can bring about good luck and predict lotto numbers, they would not be poor themselves. However, he also warns that people should not be gullible.

Phephsile Maseko, national coordinator of the Traditional Healers Organization (THO), says:

See also
San healing practices
Busi Mhlongo
John Lockley
Mercy Manci
Curandero
Murder for body parts
Ubuntu
Vusamazulu Credo Mutwa

Notes

References

Further reading

External links
Overview of Indigenous Healing in SA by the University of the Witswatersrand (WITS)
Sangoma Photo Gallery – Gallery of sangomas from different cultures around the Cape.
Spirits of Africa – Project dedicated to creating online documentaries of African spiritual and healing practices

Traditional healthcare occupations
Zulu culture
Xhosa culture
Medicine drums